The Independent Advisory Board for Senate Appointments is an independent, non-partisan body established by Canadian Prime Minister Justin Trudeau to provide merit-based recommendations on nominations to the Senate of Canada. The body was established in an attempt to end partisanship in Senate appointments. Individuals wishing to be appointed to the Senate may submit an application to the board for consideration. The board  was established on January 19, 2016 and is made up of three permanent federal members and two members from each of the provinces or territories where a vacancy is to be filled‍. On January 19, 2016, the names of the members of the Independent Advisory Board for Senate Appointments were announced. The chair is former deputy minister Huguette Labelle. There are two other federal members: Ms. Melissa Blake from Fort McMurray, Alberta and the Honourable Francois Rolland from Montreal. Two provincial or territorial members are also appointed to represent provinces and territories with current or anticipated vacancies in the Senate. This board makes up a short list of candidates to be considered for Senate vacancies, based on merit instead of partisan politics. However, the slate of recommended candidates is not binding on the Prime Minister who will make the final decision as to who is recommended to the Governor General for appointment.Since the process was established in 2016, all 60 appointments (as of July 2021) were made from recommendations provided by this Board.

See also
Advisory Committee on Vice-Regal Appointments

References

External links
Website

Senate of Canada
Federal departments and agencies of Canada
Government agencies established in 2016
Independent government agencies of Canada
2016 establishments in Canada